The 2018 Fareham Borough Council election took place on 3 May 2018 to elect members of Fareham Borough Council in England. This was on the same day as other local elections.

Half of the seats were up for re-election, with each councillor elected for a term of 4 years. The last time these seats were contested was in 2014.

As well as wards in the town of Fareham, candidates were being elected in Hill Head, Locks Heath, Park Gate, Portchester, Titchfield, Sarisbury, Stubbington and Warsash.

The composition of the council was unchanged from prior to these elections, with the Conservatives gaining one seat in Fareham East from the Lib Dems but the Lib Dems gaining one seat in Portchester East from the Conservatives after a previous defection,

After the election, the composition of the council was:
Conservative 24
Liberal Democrat 5
Independent 1 
UKIP 1

Election results
The Conservatives remained in overall control, winning 12 seats. The Liberal Democrats won 3 seats, and an independent won 1 seat.

Ward Candidates
All swings and composition changes calculated from the 2014 elections.

Fareham East

Fareham North

Fareham North West

Fareham South

Fareham West

Hill Head

Locks Heath

Park Gate

Portchester East

Portchester West

Sarisbury

Stubbington

Titchfield

Titchfield Common

Warsash

References

2018 English local elections
2018
2010s in Hampshire